Hoher Meissner transmitter is a facility for FM and TV broadcasting on Hoher Meissner mountain in Northern Hesse. The transmitter was inaugurated in 1952.
 
The mediumwave transmission at the transmitter used a 150 metre tall guyed steel-tube mast radiator insulated against ground between 1952 and 1995. In opposite to the old mast radiator, the tower was grounded and equipped with a cage antenna for mediumwave.

The mast was first used to form together with the 150 metre tall steel-tube mast radiator as a directional antenna with a minimum pointing toward Sweden and as backup antenna. Until the demolition of its main mediumwave transmitter in 2015, the transmitter was used for the latter purpose as the Hoher Meissner mediumwave transmitter, which formed together with Weiskirchen transmitter as a single frequency transmitter, which operated permanently with omnidirectional radiation pattern.

FM and TV broadcasts are transmitted using a 220 metre tall guyed lattice steel mast with a weight of 180 tons.

Radio stations

References

External links
 Overview of facility
 List of transmitted programmes
 FM-/TV-transmission mast of Hoher Meissner transmitter at Skyscraperpage
 Mediumwave transmission mast of Hoher Meissner transmitter at Skyscraperpage
 Backup mediumwave transmission mast of Hoher Meissner transmitter at Skyscraperpage
 Backup FM-transmission tower of Hoher Meissner transmitter at Skyscraperpage

Radio masts and towers in Germany
1952 establishments in Germany
Towers completed in 1952